Bhandarkar is common surname found amongst the Konkani people and Maharashtrians in India. Notable people with the surname include:

 D. R. Bhandarkar (1875–1950), Indian archaeologist and epigraphist
 Madhur Bhandarkar, film director
 Ramakrishna Gopal Bhandarkar (1837–1925), social worker, Indologist

See also
 Bhandarkar Oriental Research Institute

Indian surnames
Konkani-language surnames
Marathi-language surnames